Laureate Education, Inc. is a corporation based in Miami, Florida, United States. The firm owns and operates Laureate International Universities, with campuses in Mexico and Peru.
The company is publicly traded on the Nasdaq.

Corporate history

Beginnings: 1998–2009
Laureate Education was originally created by Douglas Becker in 1998, as Sylvan International Universities, an operational division of Sylvan Learning Systems that would focus on post-secondary institutions. At the time, Sylvan was primarily focused on services for students in primary and secondary education through company owned and franchise locations.

Sylvan International Universities' first acquisition was Spain's Universidad Europea de Madrid for $51 million in 1999. By 2001, the company had expanded to include institutions including Mexico's Universidad del Valle de México (UMV), Chile's Universidad de las Américas, Switzerland's Les Roches International School of Hotel Management, and 41% ownership of the online institution Walden University.	

In March 2003, the firm decided to focus exclusively on post-secondary education. It sold the K-12 business units, and the Sylvan name and trademark to Apollo Management, and in May 2004  changed its name to Laureate Education to reflect the new direction. Laureate took full control of Walden in September 2004, after purchasing remaining shares of the university for $109 million. The Baltimore Sun reported in 2004 that "Walden's enrollment grew tenfold from the time Laureate first invested in it four years ago."

In 2007, the firm became private after being acquired by an investor group led by Becker.

Growth: 2010–2017
Laureate continued to expand and acquire new institutions after becoming privately owned. By 2010, it owned more than 50 institutions, both campus-based and online, in 21 countries across Asia, Europe, and the Americas. According to the firm, it had a total enrollment of about 550,000 students. Former United States President Bill Clinton held a role as honorary chancellor of Laureate from 2010 until early April 2015. Clinton's publicly disclosed tax returns showed he was paid just short of $16.5 million for his work with the firm. His position included attending meetings on education issues, campus openings, and commencement ceremonies.

In January 2013, the International Finance Corporation, a member of the World Bank Group, made a $150 million equity investment in the firm to expand access to higher education in emerging markets. The firm, which had been present in Brazil since 2005, also bought Brazilian for-profit university chain Centro Universitário das Faculdades Metropolitanas Unidas for $412 million in anticipation of a growing middle-class in Brazil.

The firm was among investors in Coursera, a provider of massive online open courses, citing the opportunity to license courses through Coursera.

Arizona-based Thunderbird School of Global Management announced a partnership with the firm in March 2013 to set up a joint venture that would provide capital support for Thunderbird to open multiple international instruction sites, create an undergraduate program, and expand its executive education and online programs. The partnership proved controversial. Some trustees and alumni expressed concerns that partnering with for-profit education could negatively affect Thunderbird's reputation, while supporters said working with Laureate would allow Thunderbird, which was struggling financially, to maintain its independence.

In December 2013, Laureate announced the election of three independent directors: Robert B. Zoellick, former World Bank president; Judith Rodin, president of the Rockefeller Foundation; and George Muñoz, principal of the Muñoz Investment Banking Group. In 2015, Laureate named Ernesto Zedillo, the former president of Mexico, to the post of  Presidential Counselor replacing U. S. President Clinton.

Laureate reported revenue of approximately $4 billion in 2014. At the time, it owned 75 schools in 30 countries. Inside Higher Ed reported that total enrollment among the firm's institutions was 800,000, with its largest school, UVM, enrolling 120,000.

In July 2015,   Moody's  rated Laureate's corporate bonds as high-risk and characterized Laureate as highly leveraged.

Laureate filed for an initial public offering in October 2015. At the time, it disclosed $4.7 billion in debt, and that funds raised from the IPO would be used to reduce its debt load. At the end of 2015, the firm became a certified benefit corporation, the largest at the time. In 2016, the firm sold its two Glion Institute of Higher Education campuses, and four campuses of Les Roches to Eurazeo for $384.9 million.

The firm began trading at $14 per share on the NASDAQ on February 1, 2017. It initially offered 35 million shares, raising $490 million, and closed its first day at $13.25 per share. The IPO stated that the firm had grown to more than 1 million students and 200-plus campuses in 28 countries, and the IPO was in part a response to a global demand for more higher education among a rapidly growing middle class. It was only the third B Corporation to go public, the first two being Etsy and Rally Software.

Decline: 2017–2021
In September 2017, Becker announced his resignation as Laureate's CEO effective January 2018. He was succeeded by Chief Financial Officer Eilif Serck-Hanssen.
 
In 2018, the firm began divesting in several markets. It sold schools such as Université Internationale de Casablanca in Morocco, and Kendall College, as well as others in China, Malaysia, Italy and Cyprus. Its focus at the time was on its operations in Spain, Portugal, the U.S., and South and Central America. 
 
Laureate continued its divestiture in 2019, including ending its relationship with Istanbul Bilgi University in Istanbul, and selling University of St. Augustine for Health Sciences. 
In this period, it also closed or sold several schools, including Santa Fe University of Art and Design, Kendall College, Centro Universitário do Norte (UniNorte),  Universidad Europea de Madrid, Universidad Europea de Valencia, Universidad Europea de Canarias, Universidade Europeia in Portugal and Instituto Português de Administração de Marketing in Portugal. Laureate also reportedly sold Université Internationale de Casablanca.   Laureate also stopped enrolling new students at the University of Liverpool and the University of Roehampton.

The firm's long-term debt at the time was approximately $2.5 billion. It also provided the US Department of Education with letters of credit totaling $137 million for several schools, meant to safeguard federal student aid if the schools closed.

In May 2019, Pública, a Brazilian news outlet, published an investigative report on Laureate Education's practices in the country after 150 teachers were dismissed in December 2018. A dozen teachers accused Laureate of corruption ranging from forged documents to assigning teachers in classes outside of their area of expertise.

In 2020, the firm announced a new strategy to review its operations, including possible sales of schools in Peru, Mexico, Australia and New Zealand. It then entered into an agreement to sell its Australian and New Zealand schools to Strategic Education, Inc., and on September 11, said it would sell Walden to Adtalem for $1.48 billion. The Baltimore Business Journal reported that Laureate executives would receive $19 million in bonuses from the sale of Walden. By November, the firm had divested its universities in Australia, New Zealand and Chile,

Laureate also  announced that it would sell its Brazilian operations to Ser Educacional for $724 million. However, the firm received a higher offer of $765 million from Anima Holding during a 30-day period while it was allowed to solicit other offers. 11 institutions were included in the sale of the firm's Brazilian operations. The firm also said it had stopped enrolling students in its United Kingdom programs in 2020. The sale to Anima was completed in May 2021.

In 2021, the firm focused on its continuing operations in Mexico and Peru and plans to safely return to in-class education, noting increased demand for higher-education in those markets.
As of June 2021, the firm had reported $522 million in revenue for the year. The Walden sale was completed in August 2021, following which the firm announced a $1.29 billion cash distribution that would be made available to eligible stockholders in October. As of September 2021, the firm maintained operations in Peru and Mexico and said it would continue to operate as a public company.

Selected revenue and enrollment figures

Laureate International Universities

Laureate International Universities have taught various subjects at both undergraduate and graduate level. Subjects covered by some of its remaining colleges include design, business, culinary and hospitality, and health sciences. As of June 2021, Laureate's continuing operations in Mexico and Peru have a total enrollment of 349,000 students, according to the firm.

Mexico
Universidad del Valle de México (UVM)
Universidad Tecnológica de México (UNITEC)

Peru
CIBERTEC
Universidad Peruana de Ciencias Aplicadas (UPC)
Universidad Privada del Norte (UPN)

Institutions previously in the Laureate Education network 
These schools were previously owned or managed by Laureate Education, or offered courses in partnership with the firm.

References

External links 

 

2017 initial public offerings
B Lab-certified corporations
Companies based in Miami
Companies listed on the Nasdaq
Education companies established in 1998
Education companies of the United States
Educational institutions established in 1998
International college and university associations and consortia
Public benefit corporations based in the United States